Simiskina pediada is a butterfly in the family Lycaenidae. It is found from southern Burma to Indochina, Peninsular Malaysia and Singapore.

References

External links
, 1940. A revision of the Malayan species of Poritiinae (Lepidoptera: Lycaenidae). Trans. R. ent. Soc. Lond. 90: 337–350, 1 pl., 21 figs.
, 1969. More revisional notes on oriental butterflies. Entomologist 102: 269–278, 8 figs., 1 pl.
, 1992. In Corbet & Pendlebury, The Butterflies of the Malay Peninsula. 4th Edn. Kuala Lumpur.
, 1877. Notes on Mr. Buxton's eastern butterflies, with description of a new species of Poritia Entomologist's Monthly Magazine 13:223. *, 1863–1878.  Illustrations of diurnal Lepidoptera, Lycaenidae. Text Plates London, van Vorst, x + 229 pp. etc

Butterflies described in 1877
Simiskina
Taxa named by William Chapman Hewitson
Butterflies of Asia